was a captain of the Imperial Japanese Navy. Mitunobu worked in the Japanese naval command in China.

Biography
He attended secondary school in Osaka and then the Japanese Imperial Navy Academy graduating in 1919. He later entered active service in the Japanese navy. In 1929 he was transferred to the command of the imperial fleet.

In 1934 he was part of the staff of Isoroku Yamamoto during the preparation of the Japanese delegation for the London naval conference in which he participated as an attendant. He was probably chosen as a participant because he was aware of the European mentality with which he had become familiar as early as the 1930s when he was a naval attache at the Japanese Embassy in Paris. Following this, he participated as a ship's officer in the Second Japanese-Chinese War.

During the later stages of World War II Mitunobu was posted to Italy as a naval attaché to the Japanese embassy. There he contributed to an Italian propaganda magazine, Yamato, which was started in 1941 to improve the political alliance of Italy and Japan. According to some sources, he is also pursued secret service duties and held the role of deputy secret service chief for the Mediterranean of the Japanese Foreign Ministry. 

On 8 June 1944 Mitunobu was travelling to Merano for a naval conference of the Axis governments, together with his assistant head Yamanaka. In Pianosinatico (close to Abetone pass) along the Gothic Line, his car was stopped by Italian partisans, commanded by Manrico "Pippo" Ducceschi, and was killed as he tried to escape. Important documents concerning the War in the Pacific were found, which helped to enable the United States and the Allies in their later manoeuvers. He was buried in Königstein. His remain was brought back to Japan in 1994.

His son Oyo Mitsunobu (1934–2003) was a chemist and discovered the Mitsunobu reaction.

Notes

1897 births
1944 deaths
Japanese admirals of World War II
People from Okayama Prefecture
Imperial Japanese Navy admirals
Japanese military personnel killed in World War II